Melanocortin receptors are members of the rhodopsin family of 7-transmembrane G protein-coupled receptors.

There are five known members of the melanocortin receptor system each with differing specificities for melanocortins:

 . MC1R is associated with pigmentation genetics.
 . MC2R is also known as the ACTH receptor or corticotropin receptor because it is specific for ACTH alone.
 . MC3R is associated with childhood growth, accrual of lean mass and onset of puberty.
 . Defects in MC4R are a cause of autosomal dominant obesity, accounting for 6% of all cases of early-onset obesity.
 . MC5R
These receptors are inhibited by endogenous inverse agonists agouti signalling peptide and agouti-related peptide, and activated by synthetic (i.e. afamelanotide) and endogenous agonist melanocyte-stimulating hormones.

Selective ligands
Several selective ligands for the melanocortin receptors are known, and some synthetic compounds have been investigated as potential tanning, anti-obesity and aphrodisiac drugs, with tanning effects mainly from stimulation of MC1, while anorectic and aphrodisiac effects appear to involve both MC3 and MC4. MC1, MC3 and MC4 are widely expressed in the brain, and are also thought to be responsible for effects on mood and cognition.

Agonists
 Non-selective
 α-MSH
 β-MSH
 γ-MSH
 Afamelanotide
 Bremelanotide
 Melanotan II
 Modimelanotide
 Setmelanotide

 MC1-selective
 BMS-470,539

 MC4-selective
 PF-00446687
 PL-6983
 THIQ

 Unknown (but for certain MC2-acting)
 Alsactide
 Tetracosactide

Antagonists and inverse agonists
 Non-selective
 Agouti-related peptide
 Agouti signalling peptide

 MC4-selective
 HS-014
 HS-024
 MCL-0042
 MCL-0129
 MPB-10
 SHU-9119 (agonist at MC1 and MC5, antagonist at MC3 and MC4)

Unknown
 Semax

References

External links

 
Calculated spatial position of melanocortin-4 receptor in the lipid bilayer, inactive state with antagonist and active state with agonist

G protein-coupled receptors